Shanghai Star (上海英文星报) was a weekly English-language newspaper published in Shanghai, China, between 1992 and 2006. It was owned and run by its parent, the Beijing-based China Daily.

External links
Shanghai Star site

Newspapers published in Shanghai
English-language newspapers published in China
Publications with year of establishment missing